This is about the British soldier; for others, see Theodore Wright (disambiguation).

Captain Theodore Wright, VC (15 May 1883 – 14 September 1914) was an English recipient of the Victoria Cross, the highest and most prestigious award for gallantry in the face of the enemy that can be awarded to British and Commonwealth forces.

Details
Wright was born at Brighton, and received his education from Clifton College and the Royal Military Academy at Woolwich. He was commissioned into the Royal Engineers as a second lieutenant on 1 October 1902.

He was thirty one years old, and a captain in the 57th Field Company, Corps of Royal Engineers, British Army during the First World War when the following deed took place for which he was awarded the VC.

On 23 August 1914 at Jemappes, Mons, Belgium, a company of the Royal Scots Fusiliers were holding a barricade at the north end of a bridge over the Mons-Condé canal. By this time the firing on the position had become so violent and the casualties were so numerous that a retirement had been decided on. Lance-Corporal Charles Jarvis, of the Royal Engineers was then called upon to destroy the bridge but was without the exploder and leads. It was then that he met Captain Theodore Wright, who had been wounded in the head, who told him to go back to the bridge and he would bring the necessary equipment.

It was whilst attempting to connect the leads under the bridge to blow it that Theodore Wright earned his Victoria Cross. Time and again he tried to get at the end of the leads but each time he raised his head above the level of the towpath he was fired upon from about thirty yards off. Eventually he gave up the attempt and in swinging himself back under the girder of the bridge he lost his grip and owing to exhaustion fell into the canal, and was pulled out by a Sergeant Smith. ( Corporal Alfred Jarvis was also awarded the Victoria Cross for this same action ).

At Vailly, Aube, on 14 September 1914, Theodore Wright assisted the passage of the 5th Cavalry Brigade over a pontoon bridge, and was mortally wounded whilst assisting wounded men into shelter. An officer of the Scots Greys wrote in a letter later "We got across the river the day before yesterday a bit before our time and we had to go back over a pontoon bridge considerably quicker than was pleasant, under a very heavy fire too. At the end of the bridge was an Engineer officer repairing bits blown off and putting down straw as cool as a cucumber  – the finest thing I ever saw. The poor fellow was killed just after my troops got across. No man earned a better Victoria Cross."

The medal
His medals are displayed at The Royal Engineers Museum in Gillingham, Kent.

References

Monuments to Courage (David Harvey, 1999)
The Register of the Victoria Cross (This England, 1997)
The Sapper VCs (Gerald Napier, 1998)
VCs of the First World War - 1914 (Gerald Gliddon, 1994)

External links
Royal Engineers Museum Sappers VCs
Captain Theodore Wright (biography)
Burial location of Theodore Wright "France"}
Location of Theodore Wright's Victoria Cross "Royal Engineers Museum"
News item "Theodore Wright's Victoria Cross donated to the Royal Engineers Museum"

1883 births
1914 deaths
People from Brighton
Graduates of the Royal Military Academy, Woolwich
People educated at Clifton College
Royal Engineers officers
British World War I recipients of the Victoria Cross
British Army personnel of World War I
British military personnel killed in World War I
British Army recipients of the Victoria Cross